Nathaniel Peabody (March 30, 1774 – 1855) was a U.S. physician and dentist from Boston and Salem, Massachusetts, having studied at Dartmouth. He was descended from John Paybody of Plymouth of 1635, and in early Massachusetts records, the name of these ancestors was often spelled Pabodie. Nathaniel Peabody was a member of one of the prominent families known as the Boston Brahmins. 
Married Elizabeth ("Eliza") Palmer (1778-1853).
He was father of three intellectual women: Elizabeth Palmer Peabody, Mary Tyler Peabody Mann, and Sophia Amelia Peabody Hawthorne.

Notes

1774 births
1855 deaths
19th-century American physicians
People from colonial Boston
People of colonial Massachusetts